Domingo Segundo Moreno Jimenes (7 January 1894 in Santo Domingo – 23 September 1986 in ibidem) was a writer from the Dominican Republic; the founder and leader of the , a Dominican literary movement.

Moreno Jimenes was the only-child of the goldsmith Domingo Moreno Arriaga, and his wife María Josefa Jimenes Hernández. He was christened on 4 August 1894. He was the great-grandson and grandson of Presidents Manuel Jimenes and Juan Isidro Jimenes, respectively; the lawyer Guillermo Moreno García is his grandson. He married  Emelinda Espinal López.

References 

1894 births
1986 deaths
Dominican Republic people of Spanish descent
20th-century Dominican Republic poets
Dominican Republic male poets
Order of Merit of Duarte, Sánchez and Mella
People from Santo Domingo
Dominican Republic people of Venezuelan descent
Dominican Republic people of Basque descent
20th-century male writers